This is a list of people who served as Lord Lieutenant of Caernarvonshire. Since 1778, all Lord Lieutenants have also been Custos Rotulorum of Caernarvonshire. The post was abolished on 31 March 1974 and replaced with that of Lord Lieutenant of Gwynedd.

Lord Lieutenants of Caernarvonshire to 1974
see Lord Lieutenant of Wales before 1694''
Charles Talbot, 1st Duke of Shrewsbury 31 May 1694 – 10 March 1696
Charles Gerard, 2nd Earl of Macclesfield 10 March 1696 – 5 November 1701
William Stanley, 9th Earl of Derby 18 June 1702 – 5 November 1702
Hugh Cholmondeley, 1st Earl of Cholmondeley 2 December 1702 – 4 September 1713
Other Windsor, 2nd Earl of Plymouth 4 September 1713 – 21 October 1714
Hugh Cholmondeley, 1st Earl of Cholmondeley 21 October 1714 – 18 January 1725
George Cholmondeley, 2nd Earl of Cholmondeley 7 April 1725 – 7 May 1733
George Cholmondeley, 3rd Earl of Cholmondeley 14 June 1733 – 25 October 1760
Thomas Wynn, 1st Baron Newborough 4 July 1761 – 27 December 1781
Thomas Bulkeley, 7th Viscount Bulkeley 27 December 1781 – 3 June 1822
Thomas Assheton Smith 18 July 1822 – 12 May 1828
Peter Drummond-Burrell, 22nd Baron Willoughby de Eresby 25 November 1828 – 7 March 1851
Sir Richard Williams-Bulkeley, 10th Baronet 7 March 1851 – 14 September 1866
Edward Douglas-Pennant, 1st Baron Penrhyn 14 September 1866 – 31 March 1886
John Ernest Greaves 17 May 1886 – 5 September 1933
Hugh Douglas-Pennant, 4th Baron Penrhyn 5 September 1933 – 9 April 1941
Sir William Wynne-Finch 9 April 1941 – 27 January 1960
Sir Michael Duff, 3rd Baronet 27 January 1960 – 31 March 1974

Deputy lieutenants
A deputy lieutenant of Caernarvonshire is commissioned by the Lord Lieutenant of Caernarvonshire. Deputy lieutenants support the work of the lord-lieutenant. There can be several deputy lieutenants at any time, depending on the population of the county. Their appointment does not terminate with the changing of the lord-lieutenant, but they usually retire at age 75.

19th Century
5 August 1834: William Lloyd Gwyllym Wardle, Esq.
1 June 1846: The Lord Newborough
1 June 1846: The Lord Penrhyn
1 June 1846: Lieutenant General Sir Charles Felix Smith, 
1 June 1846: Thomas Assheton Smith, Esq.
1 June 1846: Richard Lloyd Edwards, Esq.
1 June 1846: John Griffith Griffith, Esq.
1 June 1846: Samuel Owen Priestley, Esq.
1 June 1846: George Augustus Huddart, Esq.
1 June 1846: James Hilton Ford, Esq.
1 June 1846: John Rowlands, Esq.
1 June 1846: Frank Jones Walker Jones, Esq.
1 June 1846: John Morgan, Esq.
1 June 1846: David White Griffith, Esq.
1 June 1846: John Wyatt Watling, Esq.
1 June 1846: Hugh Woodhouse Acland, Esq.

References

Sources
 
 

1974 disestablishments in Wales
Caernarfonshire
Caernarvonshire